Sufetula dulcinalis is a moth in the family Crambidae. It was described by Samuel Constantinus Snellen van Vollenhoven in 1899. It is found in Colombia.

References

Moths described in 1899
Spilomelinae
Taxa named by Samuel Constantinus Snellen van Vollenhoven